Aufacker is a mountain of Bavaria, Germany.

Mountains of Bavaria
Ammergau Alps
One-thousanders of Germany
Mountains of the Alps